Greatest Hits Volume 2 is the second greatest hits album by Australian recording artist, Marcia Hines. It was released in early 1982, following the success of Greatest Hits, which was released in December 1981 and peaked at number 2 on the Australian Kent Music Report in January 1982. This remains Hines’ highest charting album.

The chart position of Greatest Hits volume 2 is unknown.

Track listing
Side A
 "Signed, Sealed, Delivered" (3:30)
 "Love Is the Key" (2:30)
 "April Sun in Cuba" (3:45)
 "Save the Last Dance for Me" (2:39)
 "(Until) Your Love Broke Through" (3:19)
 "A Love Story" (3:35)
 "In a Mellow Mood" (2:40)
 "Maybe it's Time" (3:20)
 "Love is a Hurtin' Thing" (2:56)

Side B
 "Try it With Me" (2:46)
 "You Gotta Let Go" (3:30)
 "But it's Alright" (2:35)
 "Let the Music Play" (4:26)
 "Dance You Fool Dance" (5:16)
 "Imagination" (3:49)
 "Once We Get Started" (4:55)

References

Marcia Hines compilation albums
1982 greatest hits albums